Astra Sharma (born 11 September 1995) is a Singaporean-born Australian professional tennis player. She has career-high WTA rankings of 84 in singles and world No. 91 in doubles. Sharma has won one singles title and three doubles titles on the WTA Tour, as well as seven singles and four doubles titles on the ITF Circuit.

In December 2017, she won the Australian Open Wildcard Playoff alongside Belinda Woolcock, their main-draw entry into the 2018 Australian Open.

The highlight of her career came in the 2019 Australian Open, when she and fellow Australian John-Patrick Smith reached the final of the mixed-doubles competition, after receiving a wildcard to enter the main draw.

Personal life
Astra was born and raised in Singapore to Singaporean parents, before her parents moved to Perth, Western Australia in 2005, when she was ten years old. She attended Applecross Senior High School. As a junior, she did some training at Bullcreek Tennis Club, near Willeton. 

Astra's mother, Susan Tan, is adopted Chinese Perankan Singaporean. She was a sprinter from CHIJ Saint Theresa's Convent.
Sharma's father, Devdutt Sharma, is a Singaporean Indian. He was a high jumper. He attended Raffles Institution (RI) and National University of Singapore (NUS). He worked as an acoustic engineer and had served as a artillery officer during his service at the Singapore Armed Forces (SAF). 

Astra, named after the Astras wielded by the Hindu gods, has an older brother Ashwin who also went into a tennis career. Astra commonly speaks Singlish at home with her parents, and her favourite dish is the Singaporean dish Hainanese chicken rice.

Career

2011–2014: Career beginnings and first title
Sharma made her ITF Circuit debut in October 2011, after qualifying in Kargoorlie. In 2012, Sharma played just four tournaments, without a win. In March 2013, she reached the quarterfinals in doubles at an ITF event in Sydney. In 2014, she competed in qualifying in three tournaments across the U.S., making the main draw in just one, where she lost in the first round.

In 2015, Sharma played just three tournaments on the ITF Circuit, reaching the quarterfinal of better in all three. She won her first title in July 2015 at Sharm El Sheikh, Egypt. Sharma ended the season with a singles rank of 787. She also received a scholarship to Vanderbilt University, graduating in 2018, majoring in Medicine, Health and Society, along the way helping the Commodores win their first NCAA team tournament in 2015, with various honors such as a selection to the 2014 SEC All Freshman team and being the 2017 SEC Player of the Year. Originally intent on becoming an orthopedic surgeon, she decided not to continue in medical school as her professional tennis career took off. Still, in 2022 she used a partnership between the WTA and the University of Florida to earn a master's degree in Applied Physiology and Kinesiology.

2016–2018: ITF Circuit
In 2016, Sharma competed on the European ITF Circuit. She experienced little singles success but partnering Frances Altick, won two doubles titles in July.

She commenced the next season in June, qualifying and making the main draw in Sumter, USA. Across July and August 2017, Sharma won her second and third ITF titles in Târgu Jiu and Graz. She ended the year with a singles rank of 440.

In 2018, Sharma competed mostly on ITF events across North America. In March, she reached the final of the ITF Orlando. In June and July, she won her fourth and fifth singles titles in Baton Rouge and Gatineau, Canada. In October, she returned to Australia and reached the quarterfinals in three consecrative tournaments. Sharma ended 2018 with a singles rank of 225.

2019: First WTA final
In January 2019, Sharma qualified for the Australian Open and won her first-round match over fellow Australian Priscilla Hon, before losing in the second round. In mixed doubles, she and John-Patrick Smith made it through to the final after they defeated the second seed team of Bruno Soares and Nicole Melichar in the semifinals, but lost to the third seeds, Barbora Krejčíková and Rajeev Ram. In March, Sharma won the $25k singles and doubles at Irapuato, Mexico. In April, Sharma reached her first WTA Tour final, losing to Amanda Anisimova at the Copa Colsanitas. In May, she qualified for and reached the second round of the Strasbourg International, and later lost in the first round at the French Open. Sharma competed in qualifying events across the European grass-court season and lost in the first round of Wimbledon. In August, she travelled to North America and qualified for Cincinnati. At the US Open, Sharma lost in the first round. She ended the year with a singles rank of 108, and a doubles rank of 136.

2020: First French Open win
Sharma started 2020, losing in the singles and doubles first rounds of both Hobart International and Australian Open. For the mixed doubles, she partnered again with John-Patrick Smith, and they reached the semifinals in Melbourne. 
In March, Sharma reached the second round of the Monterrey Open and the quarterfinal of the ITF event in Irapuato, Mexico, before the tour was stopped due to the COVID-19 pandemic.

At the US Open, Sharma lost in the first round to 19th seed Dayana Yastremska in a third set tie-breaker.

She qualified for the French Open and reached the second round of this year's much later held event.

2021: First WTA title, career-high ranking
Sharma started 2021, losing in the first round of the Gippsland Trophy.
She defeated top seed Ons Jabeur to win the Charleston Open, her first WTA Tour-level title.

In May, Sharma made the second round of the French Open for a second consecutive year.
In June, she entered Wimbledon as a lucky loser and was defeated by Kristýna Plíšková in the first round.

Sharma lost in the first round of qualifying for both Canadian Open and Cincinnati Open. At the US Open, she qualified before losing to eighth seed Barbora Krejčíková in the first round. In October, she reached the second round at the Indian Wells Open.

Sharma ended 2021 with a singles ranking of 98, a career year-end high, and a doubles ranking of world No. 107.

2022-2023: Out of top 200
She reached the second round at the Indian Wells Open for the second consecutive year. Her singles ranking dropped to No. 200, on 25 July 2022.

Performance timelines

Only main-draw results in WTA Tour, Grand Slam tournaments, Fed Cup/Billie Jean King Cup and Olympic Games are included in win–loss records.

Singles
Current after the 2023 Thailand Open.

Doubles
Current after the 2023 Australian Open.

Mixed doubles

Grand Slam tournament finals

Mixed doubles: 1 (runner-up)

WTA career finals

Singles: 2 (1 title, 1 runner-up)

Doubles: 4 (3 titles, 1 runner-up)

ITF Circuit finals

Singles: 9 (7 titles, 2 runner–ups)

Doubles: 8 (4 titles, 4 runner–ups)

Notes

References

External links
 
 
 
 Vanderbilt University profile

1995 births
Living people
Australian people of Singaporean descent
Australian sportspeople of Indian descent
Australian sportspeople of Chinese descent
Australian female tennis players
Tennis players from Perth, Western Australia
Vanderbilt Commodores women's tennis players
University of Florida alumni
People from Singapore
Singaporean emigrants to Australia